A Lie conformal algebra is in some sense a generalization of a Lie algebra in that it too is a "Lie algebra," though in a different pseudo-tensor category. Lie conformal algebras are very closely related to vertex algebras and have many applications in other areas of algebra and integrable systems.

Definition and relation to Lie algebras
A Lie algebra is defined to be a vector space with a skew symmetric bilinear multiplication which satisfies the Jacobi identity. More generally, a Lie algebra is an object,  in the category of vector spaces (read: -modules) with a morphism

that is skew-symmetric and satisfies the Jacobi identity. A Lie conformal algebra, then, is an object  in the category of -modules with morphism

called the lambda bracket, which satisfies modified versions of bilinearity, skew-symmetry and the Jacobi identity:

One can see that removing all the lambda's, mu's and partials from the brackets, one simply has the definition of a Lie algebra.

Examples of Lie conformal algebras

A simple and very important example of a Lie conformal algebra is the Virasoro conformal algebra. Over  it is generated by a single element  with lambda bracket given by

In fact, it has been shown by Wakimoto that any Lie conformal algebra with lambda bracket satisfying the Jacobi identity on one generator is actually the Virasoro conformal algebra.

Classification

It has been shown that any finitely generated (as a -module) simple Lie conformal algebra is isomorphic to either the Virasoro conformal algebra, a current conformal algebra or a semi-direct product of the two.

Generalizations

Use in integrable systems and relation to the calculus of variations

References
 Victor Kac, "Vertex algebras for beginners". University Lecture Series, 10. American Mathematical Society, 1998. viii+141 pp. 

Non-associative algebra
Lie algebras
Conformal field theory